Suhail Andleev (born 8 November 1982) is an Indian first-class cricketer who plays for Jammu and Kashmir. He made his first-class debut for Jammu and Kashmir in the 2016-17 Ranji Trophy on 29 November 2016.

References

External links
 

1982 births
Living people
Indian cricketers
Jammu and Kashmir cricketers